Cupidesthes paralithas, the precise ciliate blue, is a butterfly in the family Lycaenidae. It is found in Nigeria (east and the Cross River loop) and Cameroon. The habitat consists of forests.

References

Butterflies described in 1926
Lycaenesthini